Yan Zi was the defending champion, but lost in first round to Olga Puchkova.

Anna Chakvetadze won the title, defeating Anabel Medina Garrigues in the final 6–1, 6–4.

Seeds

Draw

Finals

Top half

Bottom half

References

External links
 Official results archive (ITF)
 Official results archive (WTA)

Guangzhou International Women's Open
2006 WTA Tour